The Roseau River is a river in Dominica. It rises towards the south of the centre of the island, flowing southwest to reach the Caribbean Sea on the country's southwestern coast. The river runs through the nation's capital, Roseau.

Rivers of Dominica
Roseau